Sahdji is a 1930 ballet composition in two-movements by American composer William Grant Still. The ballet was first performed in 1931 under the direction of Howard Hanson at the Eastman School of Music. The work is about twenty minutes long.

Overview
A description of the ballet is presented as follows:

Movements
 Part I.
 Part II.

See also
 List of ballets by title
 List of jazz-influenced classical compositions

References

Further reading

External links
 
 

Compositions by William Grant Still
1930 compositions